Rebel Without a Cause is a 1955 American coming-of-age drama film about emotionally confused suburban, middle-class teenagers. Filmed in the then recently introduced CinemaScope format and directed by Nicholas Ray, it offered both social commentary and an alternative to previous films depicting delinquents in urban slum environments. The film stars James Dean, Sal Mineo, and Natalie Wood.

The film was an attempt to portray the moral decay of American youth, critique parental style, and explore the differences and conflicts between generations. In this film's case, it was the Interbellum Generation vs the Silent Generation. The title was adopted from psychiatrist Robert M. Lindner's 1944 book, Rebel Without a Cause: The Hypnoanalysis of a Criminal Psychopath. The film, however, does not make any references to Lindner's book in any way. Warner Bros. released the film on October 27, 1955, nearly a month after Dean's death in a car accident on September 30, 1955.

Over the years the film has achieved landmark status for the performance of Dean, fresh from his Oscar nominated role in East of Eden, in his most celebrated role. This was the only film during Dean's lifetime in which he received top billing. In 1990, Rebel Without a Cause was added to the Library of Congress's National Film Registry as being deemed "culturally, historically, and aesthetically significant".

Plot

In Los Angeles during the mid-1950s, teenager Jim Stark is arrested and taken to the juvenile division of a police station for public intoxication. At the station he crosses paths with John "Plato" Crawford, who was brought in for killing a litter of puppies, and Judy, who was brought in for curfew violation. The three each separately reveal their innermost frustrations to the officers; all three of them suffer from problems at home:
 Jim feels betrayed and anguished by his constantly bickering parents, Frank and Carol, but even more so by his father's timid attitude and failure to stand up to Carol; the issues are further complicated by Frank's interfering mother. His frustrations are made manifest to officer Ray Fremick when Jim is released to their custody.
 Judy is convinced that her father ignores her because she is no longer a little girl, so she dresses up in racy clothes to get attention, which only causes her father to call her a "dirty tramp".
Plato's father abandoned his family when he was a toddler, and his mother is often away from home, leaving Plato in the care of his housekeeper.

On the way to his first day at Dawson High, Jim again meets Judy and offers her a ride. Seemingly unimpressed by Jim at first, she declines and is instead picked up by her "friends", a gang of delinquents led by Buzz Gunderson. Jim is shunned by the rest of the student body but is befriended by Plato, who comes to idolize Jim as a father figure.

After a field trip to Griffith Observatory, Buzz provokes and challenges Jim to a knife fight. Jim beats Buzz in the knife fight, so to preserve his status as gang leader, Buzz suggests stealing some cars to have a "Chickie Run" at a seaside cliff. At home, Jim ambiguously asks his father for advice about defending one's honor in a dangerous situation, but Frank advises him against confrontation of any kind. That night, during the chickie run, Buzz plunges to his death when the strap on his jacket sleeve becomes entangled with his door-latch lever, preventing him from exiting the car in time. As police approach, the gang flees, leaving Judy behind, but Jim patiently persuades her to leave with him and Plato.

Jim later confides to his parents his involvement in the crash and considers turning himself in. When Carol declares they are moving again, Jim protests and pleads with Frank to stand up for him; but when Frank refuses, Jim attacks him in frustration, then storms off to the police station to confess, only to be turned away by the desk sergeant. Jim drives back home, and finds Judy waiting for him. She apologizes for her prior treatment of him due to peer pressure, and the two begin to fall in love. Agreeing that they will never return to their respective homes, Jim suggests they visit an old deserted mansion Plato told him about.

Meanwhile, Plato is intercepted by three members of Buzz's gang, who are convinced that Jim betrayed them to the police. They steal Plato's address book and go off after Jim; Plato retrieves his mother's gun and leaves to warn Jim and Judy, finding them at the mansion. The three new friends act out a fantasy as a family. Plato then falls asleep, and Jim and Judy leave to explore the mansion, where they share their first kiss and voice their love. Buzz's gang find and wake up Plato, who, frightened and distraught, shoots and wounds one of the gang. When Jim returns, he attempts to restrain Plato, but he flees, accusing Jim of leaving him behind.

Plato runs to the observatory and barricades himself inside as more police converge including Fremick who, with Frank and Carol, have been searching for Jim. Jim and Judy follow Plato into the observatory, where Jim persuades Plato to trade the gun for his red jacket; Jim quietly removes the ammunition before returning it, and then convinces Plato to come outside.  But when the police notice that Plato still has the gun they shoot Plato down as he charges them, unaware that Jim had removed the bullets. Frank comforts his grieving son, vowing to be a stronger father. Now reconciled to his parents, Jim introduces them to Judy.

Cast

Production
Warner Brothers had bought the rights to Lindner's book, intending to use the title for a film. Attempts to create a film version in the late 1940s eventually ended without a film or even a full script being produced. When Marlon Brando did a five-minute screen test for the studio in 1947, he was given fragments of one of the partial scripts. However, Brando was not auditioning for Rebel Without a Cause, and there was no offer of any part made by the studio. The film, as it later appeared, was the result of a totally new script written in the 1950s that had nothing to do with the Brando test. The screen test is included on a 2006 special edition DVD of the 1951 film A Streetcar Named Desire.

According to a biography of Natalie Wood, she almost did not get the role of Judy because Nicholas Ray thought that she did not fit the role of the wild teen character. While on a night out with friends, she got into a car accident. Upon hearing this, Ray rushed to the hospital. While in delirium, Wood overheard the doctor murmuring and calling her a "goddamn juvenile delinquent"; she soon yelled to Ray, "Did you hear what he called me, Nick?! He called me a goddamn juvenile delinquent! Now do I get the part?!"

Dawson High School, the school in the film, was actually Santa Monica High School, located in Santa Monica, California.

Exterior scenes at the abandoned mansion to which the characters retreat were filmed at the William O. Jenkins House, previously used in the film Sunset Boulevard (1950). It was demolished just two years after filming.

Irving Shulman, who adapted Nicholas Ray's initial film story into the screenplay, had considered changing the name of James Dean's character to Herman Deville, according to Jurgen Muller's Movies of the '50s. He originally had written a number of scenes that were shot and later cut from the final version of the film. According to an AFI interview with Stewart Stern, with whom Shulman worked on the screenplay, one of the scenes was thought to be too emotionally provocative to be included in the final print of the film. It portrayed the character of Jim Stark inebriated to the point of belligerence screaming at a car in the parking lot "It's a little jeep jeep! Little jeep, jeep!" The scene was considered unproductive to the story's progression by head editor William H. Ziegler and ultimately was cut. In 2006, members of the Film Society of Lincoln Center petitioned to have the scene printed and archived for historical preservation.

Sal Mineo would later note in a 1972 interview that the character of Plato Crawford was intended to have been gay. Speaking to Boze Hadleigh, he said, "[It m]akes sense [that Plato was killed off]: he was, in a way, the first gay teenager in films. You watch it now, you know he had the hots for James Dean. You watch it now, and everyone knows about Jimmy['s bisexuality], so it's like he had the hots for Natalie [Wood] and me. Ergo, I had to be bumped off, out of the way."

The film was in production from March 28 to May 26, 1955. When production began, Warner Bros. considered it a B-movie project, and Ray used black-and-white film stock. When Jack L. Warner realized James Dean was a rising star and a hot property, filming was switched to color stock, and many scenes had to be reshot in color. It was shot in the widescreen CinemaScope format, which had been introduced two years previously. With its densely expressive images, the film has been called a "landmark ... a quantum leap forward in the artistic and technical evolution of a format."

The 1949 Mercury two-door sedan James Dean drove in the movie is part of the permanent collection at the National Automobile Museum in Reno, Nevada.

Reception

Natalie Wood, Sal Mineo, and Nicholas Ray were nominated for Academy awards for their roles in Rebel Without a Cause, which grossed $7,197,000 in domestic and overseas screenings, making it Warner Bros.' second-biggest box office draw that year. The movie opened to mixed reviews when it was released on October 27, 1955, less than a month after James Dean, whose performance was praised all around by film critics, died on September 30. William Zinsser, however, wrote a scathing review of Rebel in his New York Herald Tribune column, concluding his summary of the film's plot with the words, “All this takes two hours, but it seems more like two days. The movie is written and acted so ineptly, directed so sluggishly, that all names but one will be omitted here. The exception is Dean, the gifted young actor who was killed last month. His rare talent and appealing personality even shine through this turgid melodrama."

Bosley Crowther, writing in The New York Times, described  Rebel Without a Cause as "violent, brutal and disturbing", and as an excessively graphic depiction of teen-agers and their "weird ways".  He referred to a "horrifying duel with switchblades",  a "brutal scene", and  a "shocking presentation" of a race in stolen automobiles. Although he admitted that there are moments of accuracy and truth in the film, he found these "excruciating", and discerned a "pictorial slickness" in the production's use of the CinemaScope process and its filming in the widescreen format, a slickness he declared was at odds with the realism of Ray's directing. Crowther was not impressed by James Dean's acting, and cited the various mannerisms he believed Dean copied from Marlon Brando, asserting that "Never have we seen a performer so clearly follow another's style" and calling Dean's interpretation of the Jim Stark role  a "clumsy display".

Reviewer Jack Moffitt of The Hollywood Reporter, who correctly thought the film would be a money maker, wrote a less critical, more laudatory review. He found the acting of James Dean, Natalie Wood, and Sal Mineo to be "extraordinarily good", and the direction by Nicholas Ray to be "outstanding". He praised the realistic manner in which Ray depicted the police station scenes and the engaging manner, according to Moffitt, in which he captured the nihilism of the teenage subculture for his audience. Moffitt took issue with the underlying ideology of the film, however, especially its implication, as he saw it, that professional bureaucrats could better guide youth than the American family unit itself. He criticized the film for overgeneralizing, calling this aspect a "convenient cliche", and summed up his review by describing the film as "a superficial treatment of a vital problem that has been staged brilliantly".

Robert J. Landry, managing editor of Variety magazine at the time, wrote a review published on October 26. He described Rebel as  a "fairly exciting, suspenseful and provocative, if also occasionally far-fetched, melodrama of unhappy youth on another delinquency kick." Unlike some movie critics, Landry thought that James Dean, under the influence of Nicholas Ray's direction, had mostly freed his acting of the mannerisms characteristic of Marlon Brando's style, and that his performance in the movie was "very effective".  He praised Dean's interpretation of a maladjusted teenager, noting his ability "to get inside the skin" of his character as "not often encountered".

Wanda Hale of the New York Daily News found fault with Rebels depiction, in her view, of its adults as cardboard figures and of its middle-class teenagers as hoodlums, arguing that it lacked credibility and that "[a]s an honest purposeful drama of juvenile hardness and violence the film just doesn't measure up." On the other hand, she praised James Dean's acting, writing, "[w]ith complete control of the character, he gives a fine, sensitive performance of an unhappy, lonely teenager, tormented by the knowledge of his emotional instability."

Rebel was censored in Britain by the British Board of Film Censors and released with scenes cut and an X-rating. Most of the knife fight was excised and not shown on British screens until 1967. The film was banned in New Zealand in 1955 by Chief Censor Gordon Mirams, out of fears that it would incite 'teenage delinquency', only to be released on appeal the following year with scenes cut and an R16 rating. Rebel was also banned in Spain, where it had to be smuggled into the country for private screenings, and wasn't officially released there until 1964.

Rebel Without a Cause holds a 93% fresh rating on Rotten Tomatoes based on 54 reviews, with an average rating of 8.20/10. The critical consensus reads, "Rebel Without a Cause is a searing melodrama featuring keen insight into '50s juvenile attitude and James Dean's cool, iconic performance."

Awards and accolades

American Film Institute recognition
 1998 AFI's 100 Years... 100 Movies #59
 2005 AFI's 100 Years... 100 Movie Quotes
"You're tearing me apart!" Nominated

Empire magazine recognition
 Ranked 477th on list of the 500 greatest movies of all time in 2008.

Costumes and props 

The switchblade James Dean's character used in the fight scene at Griffith Observatory was offered at auction on September 30, 2015, by Profiles in History with an estimated value of US$12,000 to $15,000; the winning bid was US$12,000. Also offered at the same auction were production photographs and a final shooting script dated August 17, 1955 for a behind-the-scenes television promotional film titled Behind the Cameras: Rebel Without a Cause hosted by Gig Young and that had scripted interviews and staged footage by the cast and crew (script winning bid US$225.)

In popular culture

Music
 The 1971 hit single "American Pie" contains the lyrics "When the Jester sang for the King and Queen in a coat he borrowed from James Dean", widely believed to be a reference to the red jacket worn by Dean's character in the film and an allusion to the windbreaker worn by Bob Dylan on the cover of his 1963 album The Freewheelin' Bob Dylan.
 The 1980 Bruce Springsteen song "Cadillac Ranch" contains the lyric, "James Dean in that Mercury '49" as one of the people meeting at the Cadillac Ranch.
 The Replacements 1989 single "I'll Be You" references this film, with the line 'like a rebel without a clue'.
 The music video for Paula Abdul's 1991 hit song "Rush Rush" reimagines Rebel Without a Cause, with faithful recreations of several key scenes. Abdul plays the role of Judy, while Keanu Reeves plays the role of Jim.

Film
Tommy Wiseau borrowed the line "You're tearing me apart" and used it in his 2003 cult hit film The Room, widely considered to be one of the worst films ever made. In the original script, it was written as "You're taking me apart, Lisa", a reference to James Dean's line "You're tearing me apart!" in Rebel Without a Cause.
In the 2016 film La La Land, the film is referenced briefly. Ryan Gosling's character Sebastian makes references to the film's ending where James Dean yells, "I got the bullets" when Emma Stone's character Mia discusses a callback for her audition. Later, the two of them are seen at the Rialto Theatre watching the opening of the film.

See also
List of American films of 1955
List of hood films

References

Notes

Bibliography
 Frascella, Lawrence and Weisel, Al: Live Fast, Die Young: The Wild Ride of Making Rebel Without a Cause. Touchstone, 2005. .

External links

 Rebel Without a Cause essay by Jay Carr at National Film Registry

 
 
 
 
 Behind the Scenes of Rebel Without a Cause: James Dean, Sal Mineo, Natalie Wood—Living Fast, Dying Young, in Life and Onscreen (Archived)
 "The Making of Rebel Without a Cause by  Sam Kashner A Vanity Fair piece about Nicholas Ray with a particular focus on Rebel.
 "Rebel Without a Cause" by Raymond Weschler
 Rebel Without a Cause essay by Daniel Eagan in America's Film Legacy: The Authoritative Guide to the Landmark Movies in the National Film Registry, A&C Black, 2010 , pages 506-507

James Dean
1955 films
1955 drama films
1950s English-language films
1950s teen drama films
American auto racing films
American coming-of-age drama films
American LGBT-related films
American teen drama films
CinemaScope films
Films scored by Leonard Rosenman
Films about dysfunctional families
Films about juvenile delinquency
Films directed by Nicholas Ray
Films set in Los Angeles
Films shot in Los Angeles
Films shot in Santa Monica, California
Films with screenplays by Stewart Stern
Teensploitation
United States National Film Registry films
Warner Bros. films
1950s American films